An apricot is a fruit, or the tree that bears the fruit, of several species in the genus Prunus.

Usually, an apricot is from the species P. armeniaca, but the fruits of the other species in Prunus sect. Armeniaca are also called apricots.

Etymology 

Apricot first appeared in English in the 16th century as abrecock from the Middle French aubercot or later abricot, from Spanish albaricoque and Catalan a(l)bercoc, in turn from Arabic الْبَرْقُوق (al-barqūq, "the plums"), from Byzantine Greek βερικοκκίᾱ (berikokkíā, "apricot tree"), derived from late Greek πραικόκιον (praikókion, "apricot") from Latin [persica ("peach")] praecocia (praecoquus, "early ripening").

Species 
Apricots are species belonging to Prunus sect. Armeniaca. The taxonomic position of P. brigantina is disputed. It is grouped with plum species according to chloroplast DNA sequences, but more closely related to apricot species according to nuclear DNA sequences.
 Prunus armeniaca – common apricot, widely cultivated for its edible fruit and kernel
 Prunus brigantina – Briançon apricot, native to Europe, cultivated for its edible fruit and oil-producing kernel
Prunus cathayana – native to Hebei
 Prunus × dasycarpa – purple apricot, cultivated in Central Asia and adjacent areas for its edible fruit
 Prunus hongpingensis – Hongping apricot, native to Shennongjia, cultivated for its edible fruit
 Prunus hypotrichodes – native to Chongqing
 Prunus limeixing – cultivated in northern China for its edible fruit
 Prunus mandshurica – Manchurian apricot, native to Northeast Asia, cultivated for its kernel, the fruits of some cultivars edible
 Prunus mume – Japanese apricot, native to southern China, widely cultivated for its beautiful blossom and edible fruit
 Prunus sibirica – Siberian apricot, native to Siberia, Mongolia, northern China, and Korea, cultivated for its kernel
 Prunus zhengheensis – Zhenghe apricot, native to Fujian

Description 

The fruit is a drupe (stonefruit) similar to a small peach,  diameter (larger in some modern cultivars), from yellow to orange, often tinged red on the side most exposed to the sun; its surface can be smooth (botanically described as: glabrous) or velvety with very short hairs (botanically: pubescent). The flesh is usually succulent, but dry in some species such as P. sibirica. Its taste can range from sweet to tart. The single seed or "kernel" is enclosed in a hard shell, often called a "stone", with a grainy, smooth texture except for three ridges running down one side.

Cultivation and uses

Origin and domestication

Prunus armeniaca 

The most commonly cultivated apricot P. armeniaca was known in Armenia during ancient times, and has been cultivated there for so long that it was previously thought to have originated there, hence the epithet of its scientific name. However, this is not supported by genetic studies, which instead confirm the hypothesis proposed by Nikolai Vavilov that domestication of P. armeniaca occurred in Central Asia and China. The domesticated apricot then diffused south to South Asia, west to West Asia (including Armenia), Europe and North Africa, and east to Japan.

Prunus mume 

Japanese apricot P. mume is another widely cultivated apricot species, usually for ornamental uses. Despite the common name, it originated from China, and was introduced to Japan in ancient times.

Cultivation practices

Apricots have a chilling requirement of 300 to 900 chilling units. A dry climate is good for fruit maturation. They are hardy in USDA zones 5 through 8. A limiting factor in apricot culture is spring frosts: They tend to flower very early (in early March in western Europe), meaning spring frost can kill the flowers. Furthermore, the trees are sensitive to temperature changes during the winter season. In China, winters can be very cold, but temperatures tend to be more stable than in Europe and especially North America, where large temperature swings can occur in winter. Hybridization with the closely related Prunus sibirica (Siberian apricot; hardy to  but with less palatable fruit) offers options for breeding more cold-tolerant plants. They prefer well-drained soils with a pH of 6.0 to 7.0.

Apricot cultivars are usually grafted onto plum or peach rootstocks. The cultivar scion provides the fruit characteristics, such as flavor and size, but the rootstock provides the growth characteristics of the plant. Some of the more popular US apricot cultivars are 'Blenheim', 'Wenatchee Moorpark', 'Tilton', and 'Perfection'. Some apricot cultivars are self-compatible, so do not require pollinizer trees; others are not: 'Moongold' and 'Sungold', for example, must be planted in pairs so they can pollinate each other.

Hybridisors have created what is known as a "black apricot" or "purple apricot", (Prunus dasycarpa), a hybrid of an apricot and the cherry plum (Prunus cerasifera). Other apricot–plum hybrids are variously called plumcots, apriplums, pluots, or apriums.

Pests and diseases 

Apricots are susceptible to various diseases whose relative importance differs in the major production regions as a consequence of their climatic differences. For example, hot weather as experienced in California's Central Valley often causes pit burn, a condition of soft and brown fruit around the pit. Bacterial diseases include bacterial spot and crown gall. Fungal diseases include brown rot caused by Monilinia fructicola: infection of the blossom by rainfall leads to "blossom wilt" whereby the blossoms and young shoots turn brown and die; the twigs die back in a severe attack; brown rot of the fruit is due to Monilinia infection later in the season. Dieback of branches in the summer is attributed to the fungus Eutypa lata, where examination of the base of the dead branch reveals a canker surrounding a pruning wound. Other fungal diseases are black knot, Alternaria spot and fruit rot, and powdery mildew. Unlike peaches, apricots are not affected by leaf curl, and bacterial canker (causing sunken patches in the bark, which then spread and kill the affected branch or tree) and silver leaf are not serious threats, which means that pruning in late winter is considered safe.

Kernel

Due to their natural amygdalin content culinary uses for the kernel are limited. Oil made from apricot kernels is safe for human consumption without treatment because amygdalin is not oil soluble. Ground up shells are used in cosmetics as an exfoliant. As an exfoliant it provides an environmentally friendly alternative to plastic microbeads.

Apricot kernels can be made into a plant milk.

Production 

In 2020, world production of apricots was 3.72 million tonnes, led by Turkey with 22% of the total (table). Other major producers (in descending order) were Uzbekistan, Iran, Italy, and Algeria.

Turkey
Malatya is the center of Turkey's apricot industry.

Nutrition 

In a 100-gram amount, raw apricots supply 48 Calories and are composed of 11% carbohydrates, 1% protein, less than 1% fat, and 86% water (table). Raw apricots are a moderate source of vitamin A and vitamin C (12% of the Daily Value each).

Dried apricots 

Dried apricots are a type of traditional dried fruit. The world's largest producer of dried apricots is Turkey. When treated with sulfur dioxide (E220), the color is vivid orange. Organic fruit not treated with sulfur dioxide is darker in color and has a coarser texture. When apricots are dried, the relative concentration of nutrients is increased, with vitamin A, vitamin E, potassium, and iron having Daily Values above 25% (table).

Phytochemicals 
Apricots contain various phytochemicals, such as provitamin A beta-carotene and polyphenols, including catechins and chlorogenic acid. Taste and aroma compounds include sucrose, glucose, organic acids, terpenes, aldehydes and lactones.

Apricot kernels (seeds) contain amygdalin, a poisonous compound. On average, bitter apricot kernels contain about 5% amygdalin and sweet kernels about 0.9% amygdalin. These values correspond to 0.3% and 0.05% of cyanide. Since a typical apricot kernel weighs 600 mg, bitter and sweet varieties contain, respectively, 1.8 and 0.3 mg of cyanide.

In culture 

The apricot is the national fruit of Armenia, mostly growing in the Ararat plain. It is often depicted on souvenirs.

The Chinese associate the apricot with education and medicine. For instance, the classical word 杏 壇 (literally: "apricot altar") (xìng tán 杏坛) which means "educational circle", is still widely used in written language. Chuang Tzu, a Chinese philosopher in the fourth century BC, told a story that Confucius taught his students in a forum surrounded by the wood of apricot trees. The association with medicine in turn comes from the common use of apricot kernels as a component in traditional Chinese medicine, and from the story of Dong Feng (董奉), a physician during the Three Kingdoms period, who required no payment from his patients except that they plant apricot trees in his orchard upon recovering from their illnesses, resulting in a large grove of apricot trees and a steady supply of medicinal ingredients. The term "expert of the apricot grove" (杏林高手) is still used as a poetic reference to physicians.

The fact that apricot season is short has given rise to the common Egyptian Arabic and Palestinian Arabic expression filmishmish ("in apricot [season]") or bukra filmishmish ("tomorrow in apricot [season]"), generally uttered as a riposte to an unlikely prediction, or as a rash promise to fulfill a request.

In Middle Eastern and North African cuisines, apricots are used to make Qamar al-Din ( "Moon of the Religion"), a thick apricot drink that is a popular fixture at Iftar during Ramadan. Qamar al-Din is believed to originate in Damascus, Syria, where the variety of apricots most suitable for the drink was first grown.

In Jewish culture, apricots are commonly eaten as part of the Tu Bishvat seder.

The Turkish idiom bundan iyisi Şam'da kayısı (literally, "the only thing better than this is an apricot in Damascus") means "it doesn't get any better than this".

In the US Marines it is considered exceptionally bad luck to eat or possess apricots, especially near tanks. This superstition has been documented since at least the Vietnam War and is often cited as originating in World War II. Even calling them by their name is considered unlucky, so they are instead called "cots", "Forbidden fruit" or "A-fruit".

Gallery

See also 
 Barack (brandy)
 Apricot plum, Prunus simonii

References

External links 

 

Armeniaca
 
Crops originating from China
Edible fruits
Fruits originating in Asia
Garden plants of Asia
Prunus
Drupes